National Aviation Aerodrome  is an airport in Goiânia, Brazil.

History
The airport is dedicated to general aviation.

Airlines and destinations
No scheduled flights operate at this airport.

Access

See also

List of airports in Brazil

References

External links

Airports in Goiás
Goiânia